The 6th Secretariat of the Communist Party of Vietnam (CPV), formally the 6th Secretariat of the Central Committee of the Communist Party of Vietnam (Vietnamese: Ban Bí thư Ban Chấp hành Trung ương Đảng Cộng sản Việt Nam Khoá VI), was elected by the 1st Plenary Session of the 6th Central Committee (CC) in the immediate aftermath of the 6th National Congress.

Members

References

Bibliography
 

6th Secretariat of the Communist Party of Vietnam